...And Time Begins is the debut studio album by American death metal band Decrepit Birth. It was released on October 7, 2003 through Unique Leader Records. Compared to their later albums, this album displays a more brutal sound and is more akin to Disgorge and Suffocation.

Track listing

Personnel
Decrepit Birth
Bill Robinson - Vocals 
Matt Sotelo - Guitars, Vocals
Derek Boyer - Bass, Vocals
Tim Yeung - Drums

Production
Dan Seagrave - Cover art
Jen Powell - Photography
Matt Sotelo - Engineering
Derek Boyer - Engineering
Damon Cisneros - Recording (drums only)
Colin Davis - Mixing, Mastering
Jacoby - Layout, Design

References

2003 debut albums
Decrepit Birth albums
Unique Leader Records albums
Albums with cover art by Dan Seagrave